Windsor Downs is a suburb of Sydney, within the City of Hawkesbury of the state of New South Wales, Australia, established in the early 1990s. Located 53km from the CBD of Sydney, Windsor Downs has a population of 1179 as of the 2016 census. Windsor Downs is located alongside the Windsor Downs Nature Reserve and is the entrance point for several of the trails.

References

Suburbs of Sydney
City of Hawkesbury